Frederick Augustus Tallmadge (August 29, 1792 – September 17, 1869) was an American lawyer and politician from New York.

Life
He was born on August 29, 1792, in Litchfield, Connecticut, the son of Benjamin Tallmadge (1754–1835) and Mary Floyd (1764-1805). William Floyd (1734–1821) was his grandfather. He graduated from Yale College in 1811. Then he studied law at Litchfield Law School, was admitted to the bar and commenced practice in New York City in 1813.

Career
Tallmadge served as a captain of the militia in the War of 1812.

He was a member of the Board of Aldermen in 1834 and, under the new city charter, of the Common Council in 1836. He was a member of the New York State Senate (1st D.) from 1837 to 1840, sitting in the 60th, 61st, 62nd and 63rd New York State Legislatures. He was Recorder of New York City from 1841 to 1846, and from 1848 to 1851.

He was elected as a Whig to the 30th United States Congress, holding office from March 4, 1847, to March 3, 1849. He was Superintendent of the Metropolitan Police from 1857 to 1862. In 1861, he ran on the "Independent People's" ticket for Canal Commissioner but was defeated by Democrat William W. Wright. He was Clerk of the New York Court of Appeals from 1863 to 1865, elected in 1862 on the Democratic/Constitutional Union ticket. Afterwards he resumed the practice of law in New York City.

Personal life

He married Elizabeth "Eliza" H. Canfield (1793–1878) and together they had:
Frederick Samuel Tallmadge (c.1823–1904), who was president of the New York Society of the Sons of the Revolution from 1884 until his death in 1904.
He died on September 17, 1869, at the home of his daughter in Litchfield, Connecticut; and was buried at the East Cemetery there.

Sources

External links

1792 births
1869 deaths
Politicians from Litchfield, Connecticut
Yale College alumni
Litchfield Law School alumni
New York (state) state senators
Clerks of the New York Court of Appeals
New York City Council members
New York (state) Constitutional Unionists
New York (state) Democrats
New York City Recorders
Whig Party members of the United States House of Representatives from New York (state)
19th-century American politicians